Biraj Bhakta Shrestha is a Nepalese politician and member of Rastriya Swatantra Party. He was elected to the House of Representatives from Kathmandu 8 in the 2022 general elections. 

He previously served as a member of the inaugural Bagmati Provincial Assembly from the Bibeksheel Sajha party list.

See also 
 Rastriya Swatantra Party

References

Members of the Provincial Assembly of Bagmati Province
Rastriya Swatantra Party politicians
Nepal MPs 2022–present
1981 births
Living people